Statue of Gautama Buddha may refer to:

 Daibutsu, a type of Japanese statue
 Great Buddha (disambiguation)

Large Gautama Buddha statues
 Awaji Kannon, an  statue in Japan
 Buddha Statue of Hyderabad, an  statue in India
 Buddhas of Bamiyan, a  statue and a  statue in Afghanistan, now destroyed
 Dhyana Buddha statue, a  statue in India
 Grand Buddha at Ling Shan, a  statue in China
 Laykyun Sekkya, a  statue in Myanmar
 Luangpho Yai, a  statue in Thailand
 Phuket Big Buddha, a  statue in Thailand
 Spring Temple Buddha, a  statue in China

Smaller Gautama Buddha statues
 Buddha Preaching his First Sermon (Sarnath), in India
 Emerald Buddha, in Thailand
 Gatbawi, in South Korea
 Karumadikkuttan, in India
 Phra Phuttha Sihing, in Thailand
 Seated Buddha from Gandhara, in Pakistan
 Standing Buddha from Gandhara (Tokyo), a Greco-Buddhist statue in Japan
 Sultanganj Buddha, from India and now in England
 Toluvila statue, in Sri Lanka